The International Organisation for Mycoplasmology (IOM) is a non-profit making organisation founded in 1976. It promotes the study of mycoplasmas (mollicutes), bacteria without a cell wall, and the diseases associated with them.

Areas of research 
The IOM produces an annual report covering all areas of mycoplasmology. Specific areas of research currently undertaken include mycoplasma arthritis, avian mycoplasmas, cell culture mycoplasmas, molecular genetics, phytoplasmas and ureaplasmas. The IOM also puts emphasis on pathogenesis, vaccines and mycoplasmal diseases of domestic animals and plants.

Membership 
In 2013 the institute had about 500 members. Specialists include: microbiologists, clinicians, biochemists, entomologists, plant pathologists, veterinarians and geneticists.

See also 
 Emmy Klieneberger-Nobel 
 Leonard Hayflick

References 

Medical research institutes
Research institutes established in 1976
Mollicutes
Rodent-carried diseases
Bacterial plant pathogens and diseases
International medical and health organizations